Minnesota State Highway 120 (MN 120) is a  highway in Minnesota, which runs from a point south of its interchange with Interstate Highway 94 in Maplewood (near Landfall) and continues north to its northern terminus at its intersection with State Highway 244 and Ramsey County Road 15 at the White Bear Lake / Mahtomedi boundary line.

Highway 120 is also known as Century Avenue, Geneva Avenue, and Division Street at various points throughout its route.

The route runs along the county line for Washington and Ramsey counties for most of its length.

Route description
Highway 120 serves as a north–south route between the communities of Maplewood, Oakdale, North St. Paul, White Bear Lake, and Mahtomedi.

The Gateway Bicycle Trail crosses Highway 120 near Highway 36 at the North St. Paul / Oakdale boundary line.

Highway 120 mostly parallels I-694 throughout its route.  Highway 120 also has an interchange with I-694 at the White Bear Lake / Mahtomedi boundary line.

The route is legally defined as Route 117 in the Minnesota Statutes. It is not marked with this number.

History
The present day Highway 120 was established in 1965. Previously, this route was part of Highway 100 (hence the name Century Avenue) from 1934 to 1965.

This route was originally part of the Highway 100 Beltway circling the entire Twin Cities during the 1940s and 1950s.

Highway 120 was numbered as a derivative of Highway 100.

The 2001 Minnesota Legislature approved removal of Highway 120 from the state trunk highway system. Washington and Ramsey counties in 2001. The portion of the route in Washington (from I-94 to I-494) has been removed, but the part of the highway in Ramsey is still marked and the legal definition of its legislative route has not been changed.

At one time, Highway 120 had continued farther south.  Before 2002, the route had continued south of I-94 on present day County 72 / County 25 (the Maplewood / Woodbury boundary line) until reaching Valley Creek Road in Woodbury. Highway 120 then briefly followed Valley Creek Road (present day County 16) eastbound until its interchange with I-494.

Highway 120 previously had a brief concurrency with State Highway 5. In 2015, the state turned back the portions of Highway 5 along and east of Century Avenue over to Washington County.

Major intersections

See also

References

External links

120
Transportation in Ramsey County, Minnesota
Transportation in Washington County, Minnesota